Bosko's Store is a 1932 Warner Bros. Looney Tunes cartoon directed by Hugh Harman. It was released on August 13, 1932, and stars Bosko, the first star of the series. As is the case with most Looney Tunes of its time, it was directed by Hugh Harman and its music scored by Frank Marsales.

Plot
The story opens with Bosko scatting and whistling a happy tune as he cleans the window of his general store. A telephone rings and Bosko answers; a voice on the other end makes a fairly unintelligible request that Bosko interprets as one for bologna. Bosko turns on a small electric fan after retrieving a sausage from which he chops thin slices using the spinning blades. As the slices fall onto a scale, Bosko's dog, wafted thither by the scent, approaches master and meat. The naughty canine paws the empty balance of the scale, reversing it and flipping the cold cuts into his salivating maw. This he repeats as the whistling Bosko absent-mindedly further depletes the bologna. The dog's shape reflects his gluttony, becoming more sausage-like as he devours more of the delicacy; once Bosko realizes that his meat has disappeared, the animal cannot disguise his guilt. He dances, making accordion-like sounds as he hops away; pursued by Bosko, he runs carelessly through another fan, slices of his body being cut off in the process, rejoining at once upon hitting the other side of the floor. Having enjoyed the run, our laughing hero forgets his trouble and begins to dust the shop as he dances about: he dusts eggs out of which live chicks pop and a lady in an advertisement who smacks him with her rolling pin (for the affront!)

A miniature Mickey Mouse-counterfeit uses the pulley of a window blind in order to reach a telephone, whereat he rides the rotary dial as though it were a merry-go-round. It seems that "Mickey" was dialing the store's number, and a telephone rings across the room. Bosko answers it; pseudo-Mickey's mouthpiece having fallen, he must slide down the wire in order to speak and climb up again to hear Bosko's response. "Have you got any dry fish?" he asks; Bosko says that he has. "Well," the prankster replies, "give 'em a drink!"

Bosko steps out and sweeps his porch while dancing, his broom his partner; he lifts up a large, sleeping dog in order to sweep under it. Enter Honey with a frilly umbrella and her bratty, feline piano-protégé (also seen in Bosko's Soda Fountain.) Greeting her beau, she requests of him a nickel for a nearby player piano; eating Bosko's coin greedily, the pianola starts the music. The lovers dance together, Honey scatting, Bosko stopping only when he spots Honey's charge picking and eating his bananas. The youngster plucks another and fires its soft yellow fruit square at Bosko's reprimanding face. Stumbling back into the store, Bosko falls into a basket connected to a pulley; the tormenting kitten pulls it, raising Bosko high into the air and across the room and, eventually, into the wall, whereupon our hero tumbles down to the floor.

Staggering about, Bosko comes to a rest at a cash register whose keyboard's being depressed by Bosko's hand releases its drawer, which strikes Bosko, knocking him backwards again. Back, back he stumbles into a barrel of molasses which falls over, drenching him in its miry, brown former contents. Stuck as in quicksand, the irate Bosko cannot free his feet to chase the little devil, who taunts him accordingly. The scamp climbs a nearby hanging thread to a high shelf only to find that the thread is on a spool; once it has run out, the cat falls toward a store-counter and onto the crank of a meat grinder, spins about on it, is flung into the air, and falls into the grinder, coming out on the floor in droplets that transmute at once into tiny clones of himself and which then rejoin to the victim's bewilderment. Bosko is helpless until he frees his feet from his shoes; that done, the stocking-footed Bosko pursues his tormentor, as the little cat ascends and rides a wheeled ladder, knocking over cans from a high shelf as he does so, which cans, falling, strike poor Bosko's head.

Cornered at last, the imp spies a large spool of woolen thread: reaching for the counter on which it sits, he, taking the end, slyly slips between Bosko's legs and runs, scorching Bosko's rump with the quick-withdrawing thread as he does so. The beaten Bosko holds his pained posterior as the iris unceremoniously shuts.

References

External links
 
Bosko's Store on YouTube (unrestored)

1932 films
1932 animated films
1930s American animated films
1930s animated short films
American black-and-white films
Films scored by Frank Marsales
Films directed by Hugh Harman
Bosko films
Looney Tunes shorts